Manchester Exchange was a parliamentary constituency in the city of Manchester.  It returned one Member of Parliament (MP) to the House of Commons of the Parliament of the United Kingdom, elected by the first past the post system.

The constituency was created for the 1918 general election and abolished for the February 1974 general election.

Boundaries 
1918–1950: The County Borough of Manchester wards of Cheetham, Collegiate Church, Exchange, Oxford, St Ann's, St Clement's, and St John's, and part of St Michael's ward.

1950–1955: The County Borough of Manchester wards of All Saints, Exchange, Medlock Street, Oxford, St Ann's, St Clement's, St George's, St John's, and St Luke's.

1955–1974: The County Borough of Manchester wards of All Saints, Beswick, New Cross, St George's, and St Peter's.

Members of Parliament

Election results

Elections in the 1910s

Elections in the 1920s

Election in the 1930s

Election in the 1940s
General Election 1939–40:

Another General Election was required to take place before the end of 1940. The political parties had been making preparations for an election to take place from 1939 and by the end of this year, the following candidates had been selected; 
Conservative: Peter Eckersley
Liberal: George Paish
Labour: R McKeon

Elections in the 1950s

Elections in the 1960s

Elections in the 1970s

References 

 

Exchange
Constituencies of the Parliament of the United Kingdom established in 1918
Constituencies of the Parliament of the United Kingdom disestablished in 1974